Gary Brunotte (born October 4, 1948, in St. Paul, Minnesota) is an American post-bop jazz musician.

In 1992 Brunotte recorded the album Yesterday's Dream, which included saxophonist Eric Marienthal.

Select discography
Yesterdays Dream – 1993
Conversations – 2005
Smile – 2006
Manic Moments 2007
About Time – 2008

See also
 List of jazz arrangers
List of jazz organists
List of jazz pianists

References

Conrad, Thomas "Smile: Review" JazzTimes
 Barron, John "Manic Moments: Review" AllAboutJazz 
 Santella, Jim "Smile: Review" AllAboutJazz 
 Yanow, Scott [ "Conversations: Review" ] AllMusic

External links 
 

1948 births
Musicians from Saint Paul, Minnesota
Post-bop pianists
Living people
American jazz pianists
American male pianists
American jazz organists
American male organists
Berklee College of Music faculty
20th-century American pianists
Jazz musicians from Minnesota
21st-century American pianists
21st-century organists
20th-century American male musicians
21st-century American male musicians
American male jazz musicians
21st-century American keyboardists